The Charles Hard Townes Award of The Optical Society is a prize for Quantum Electronics — that is to say, the physics of lasers. Awarded annually since 1981, it is named after the Nobel Prize-winning laser pioneer Charles H. Townes.

Former winners include Nobel Prize laureates John L. Hall, Claude Cohen-Tannoudji, Serge Haroche, Arthur Ashkin, and Gérard Mourou.

Recipients

See also

 List of physics awards

References 

Awards of Optica (society)
Awards established in 1981
Quantum electronics